The Palmerston Forts are a group of forts and associated structures around the coasts of the United Kingdom and Ireland.

The forts were built during the Victorian period on the recommendations of the 1860 Royal Commission on the Defence of the United Kingdom, prompted by concerns about the strength of the French Navy, and strenuous debate in Parliament about whether the cost could be justified. The name comes from their association with Lord Palmerston, who was Prime Minister at the time and promoted the idea.

The works were also known as Palmerston's Follies, partly because the first ones which were around Portsmouth, had their main armament facing inland to protect Portsmouth from a land-based attack, and thus (as it appeared to some) facing the wrong way to defend from a French attack. The name also derived from the use of the term "folly" to indicate "a costly ornamental building with no practical value". They were criticized because at the time of their completion, the threat from the French navy had passed, largely due to the complete alignment of Napoleon III's foreign policy with British interests then to the withdrawal of France following its crushing by Prussia in the Franco-Prussian war of 1870, and because the technology of the guns had become obsolete. They were the most costly and extensive system of fixed defences undertaken in Britain in peacetime.

Some sixty years previously, there had been a similar period of defence works construction, when some 140 circular towers were built for the same purpose (mainly along the Sussex, Kent and Suffolk coast to protect London) called Martello Towers, but these had become outdated.

The new defences were built to defend a number of key areas of the British, Irish and Channel Island coastline, in particular areas around military bases, including:

Alderney
Belfast
Berehaven
Bristol Channel
Chatham
River Clyde
 Cork
Dover
Isle of Wight
Milford Haven
North Thames and East Anglia
North East England
Plymouth
Portland
Portsmouth
Lough Swilly
South Coast (other than those included in specific areas)

A complete list is available online.

 High Knoll Fort

See also
 Folly fort
 Hurst Castle
 Maunsell Forts
 Martello tower

References

External links

 Palmerston Forts Society
 Victorian Forts and Artillery

 
Invasions of England
Lists of forts